Michael James Craig (born 16 April 2003) is a professional footballer. He plays as a midfielder for the EFL Championship club Reading.

Background
Michael Craig and his younger identical twin brother Matthew were born 2 minutes apart on 16 March 2003. Both of their grandfathers hail from Scotland including Aberdeen born Ron Still who top scored for Notts County one season and also played for Brentford F.C., both in the mid 1960s.

Club career
Michael Craig and  twin brother Matthew both played for Watford F.C. at a young age before both joined Tottenham Hotspur when aged 12. Michael was at Arsenal between Watford and Spurs. Whilst with Tottenham Hotspur,

Craig featured on the bench for the away leg of their UEFA Europa Conference League Playoff tie against Paços de Ferreira. In February 2022, he went on trial with fellow Premier League side Southampton.

Reading 
In April 2022, Craig featured for Reading in their Berks & Bucks Senior Cup semi-final against Milton Keynes Dons.

On 22 June 2022, Reading announced the signing of Craig to their U23 team. Craig made his debut for Reading in their 2-1 EFL Cup defeat to Stevenage on 9 August 2022, coming on as a second half substitute for Tyrese Fornah.

International career
Both born in England, Michael Craig and his younger identical twin Matthew Craig have represented Scotland at age group level. Matthew said of their international allegiance, "“Both of my grandfathers are Scottish. Obviously, once Scotland came calling, it was a big honour to be selected here, There wasn’t a debate.”

Craig has represented Scotland at U16, U17 and U19 level. On 8 September 2022, Craig was called up to the Scotland U21 squad for the first time, making his debut on 22 September 2022 against Northern Ireland.

Career statistics

References

External links
 

2003 births
Living people
British identical twins
English footballers
Scottish footballers
Reading F.C. players
Association football midfielders
Scotland youth international footballers
Tottenham Hotspur F.C. players
English Football League players
Scotland under-21 international footballers